Arcadia Valley School District is a public school district serving portions of Iron County, Missouri.

History

Schools
Arcadia Valley Elementary School
Arcadia Valley Middle School
Arcadia Valley High School
Arcadia Valley Career Technology Center

Athletics
Arcadia Valley Tigers Boys' Basketball

The 2009-2010 Boys' Basketball team had a record of 28–1.

Arcadia Valley Tigers Girls' Cross Country

The 2012-2013 Girls' Cross Country team finished second at state (highest finish in AV history)

References

External links

Education in Iron County, Missouri
School districts in Missouri